Agent Game is a 2022 American spy action-thriller film directed by Grant S. Johnson and written by Mike Langer and producer Tyler W. Konney. It stars Dermot Mulroney, Adan Canto, Katie Cassidy, Annie Ilonzeh, Rhys Coiro, Barkhad Abdi, Jason Isaacs, and Mel Gibson. Filming took place in Augusta, Georgia, from March to April 2021.

The film was released in the United States on April 8, 2022, by Saban Films. It was panned by critics.

Premise
CIA officer Harris is involved in missions to detain and relocate foreign nationals for interrogation. When Harris' superior is murdered, he finds himself the scapegoat for the killing of a detainee and must run from a team of operatives sent to bring him in, led by a ruthless double agent.

Cast
 Dermot Mulroney as Harris, a CIA officer
 Adan Canto as Kavinsky, an operative
 Katie Cassidy as Miller, an operative
 Annie Ilonzeh as Visser, an agent
 Rhys Coiro as Reese, an operative
 Barkhad Abdi as Omar, a detainee
 Jason Isaacs as Bill, Harris' superior
 Mel Gibson as Olsen, a high-ranking official in the CIA
 Matt Riedy as Deputy Director, a CIA deputy director

Production

Development

The independent film Agent Game was announced on March 5, 2021, when it was reported that Mel Gibson, Dermot Mulroney, Katherine McNamara, Rhys Coiro, and Annie Ilonzeh had been cast in the project from director Grant S. Johnson and writers Mike Langer and Tyler W. Konney. Soon after, Katie Cassidy, Jason Isaacs, Barkhad Abdi, and Adan Canto joined the cast.

Filming
Principal photography for the film began in Augusta, Georgia, on March 29, 2021, and concluded the following month on April 23. Filming locations included the Augusta University Building on 699 Broad Street, Thomson-McDuffie Regional Airport, and a warehouse on Evans to Locks Road used to replicate a European airplane hangar, where a shootout scene and multiple explosions were shot. The Sibley Mill on the Augusta Canal was also used to create the "secret spy detention center" in the film. Due to the presence of gunfire, a letter was sent to local residents before the production shot a scene in which Gibson fires a prop gun multiple times towards a moving vehicle.

In shooting the film in Georgia, production manager Mark Crump said he spoke with line producer Warren Ostergard to take the project to the state. Konney, who also co-produced the film, said that the production would help the local economy, with the Film Augusta designee, Jennifer Bowen, estimating its economic impact to be in the region of $1 million. In a separate interview, Konney also mentioned that the project was able to hire local people from  Augusta for every department in the film, allowing the production crew to accomplish their "big ambitions".

Release
The film was released online and in select theaters in the United States on April 8, 2022, by Saban Films.

Reception
On the review aggregator website Rotten Tomatoes, 21% of 14 critics' reviews are positive.

References

External links
 

2022 films
2022 action films
2022 action thriller films
2022 thriller films
2020s American films
2020s English-language films
2020s spy thriller films
American action thriller films
American spy action films
American spy thriller films
Films about the Central Intelligence Agency
Films set in Washington, D.C.
Films shot in Georgia (U.S. state)
Saban Films films